La Crosse Aquinas Catholic Schools or ACS is a school district in La Crosse, Wisconsin and Onalaska, Wisconsin operated by the Roman Catholic Diocese of La Crosse.  Previously known as Coulee Catholic Schools, the district changed its name in 2009 to Aquinas Catholic Schools.

History 

In 1857, the first Catholic school opened in the Coulee Region. As parishes were built in the area, so were schools, in some cases even before the church. Area Catholic schools unified in 2000 under the name Coulee Catholic Schools to offer equal opportunities to all schools, standardize curriculum, and improve operational efficiency. In 2009 the school system was renamed Aquinas Catholic Schools, taking the name of the patron saint of schools.  The school still holds the distinction as having one of the best hockey teams in the country.

Schools 
Aquinas High School, La Crosse, Wisconsin.
 Aquinas Middle School, La Crosse, Wisconsin.
Blessed Sacrament Elementary School, La Crosse, Wisconsin.
Cathedral of St. Joseph the Workman Elementary School, La Crosse, Wisconsin.
Mary, Mother of the Church Early Childhood Center, La Crosse, Wisconsin.
St. Patrick Elementary School, Onalaska, Wisconsin.

References

External links
 La Crosse Aquinas Catholic Schools

La Crosse, Wisconsin
Education in La Crosse County, Wisconsin
Catholic schools in Wisconsin